Adama Diakité (born 4 July 1978) is a Malian footballer. He played in ten matches for the Mali national football team in 2001 and 2002. He was also named in Mali's squad for the 2002 African Cup of Nations tournament.

References

External links
 

1978 births
Living people
Malian footballers
Mali international footballers
2002 African Cup of Nations players
Place of birth missing (living people)
Association football defenders
Stade Malien players
Djoliba AC players
21st-century Malian people